Peter Casparsson (born 14 March 1975 in Falun) is a Swedish former professional ice hockey defenceman currently a goaltending coach for Mora IK of the HockeyAllsvenskan

He played in the Swedish Elitserien for Leksands IF, Linköpings HC and Malmö IF.  In 2005, he moved Italy and played in Serie A for SG Cortina and then in 2006 he moved to Germany's Deutsche Eishockey Liga and played for the Straubing Tigers. He played the last five seasons of his career with the Vienna Capitals of the Austrian Hockey League before announcing his retirement on July 30, 2012. He would immediately assume a coaching role with Mora IK.

Career statistics

References

External links

1975 births
SG Cortina players
Leksands IF players
Linköping HC players
Living people
Malmö Redhawks players
Rögle BK players
Straubing Tigers players
Swedish ice hockey defencemen
Vienna Capitals players
People from Falun
Sportspeople from Dalarna County